Renegade Legion is a series of science fiction games that were designed by Sam Lewis, produced by FASA, and published from 1989 to 1993. The line was then licensed to Nightshift games, a spin-off of the garage company Crunchy Frog Enterprises by Paul Arden Lidberg, which published one scenario book, a gaming aid, and three issues of a fanzine-quality periodical before reverting the license.

Set in the 69th Century, the series allowed gamers to play out the battles between the "Terran Overlord Government (TOG)", a corrupt galactic empire, and the "Commonwealth", an alliance of humans and aliens.  The focus of the plot, like with many strategy games, is to present a long term conflict to enable as many individual situations and environments as possible.  Most of Renegade Legion deals with large, military battles to be played on hexagonal grid mapsheets in a turn-based rules system.

The Plotline 

The setting can best fit into the space opera category.  The themes involve large-scale military operations as the Terran Overlord Government (TOG for short) attempts to completely conquer the Milky Way Galaxy.  There are many alien races involved, and stories often use elements such royal bloodlines, betrayal, and normally leave little room for a peaceful solution.

The back story to the setting has the human race exploring and colonizing many worlds in the galaxy, and coming into contact with several important alien races.  After the Snow Plague that eliminates most of the human race, Earth is invaded and conquered by the Kess Rith, a reptilian alien race that can best be physically described as half iguana and half centaur.

Later the humans on Earth successfully rebel and drive off the Kess Rith by emulating the ancient Roman civilization.  Over the span of centuries of time this new human movement, which started out as only a noble liberation of Earth and human colony worlds becomes a military dictatorship after a terrorist bomb kills most of the senate.  The new government is then led by a Caesar (dictator for life), and appoints a number of personal representatives called Overlords who wield nearly unlimited legal power.  It is at this time that a significant disaffected portion of the TOG military defects to the Commonwealth, another human space faring nation smaller than the TOG.  TOG becomes increasingly militant, engages in bloodsports, legalizes slavery, and reduces women to property of their father or husband in order to remove their right to vote as women often ruled against further military expansion and conquests.  After defeating the Kess Rith, the new Terran Overlord Government continues their military conquest and attacks other nations who were neutral during their time spent under Kess Rith rule.

The single largest enemy of the TOG is the Commonwealth.  It is based primarily on old Earth culture of Britain.  While still maintaining its own royal family, it is far more democratic than the TOG, accepts women and aliens as equals, and even includes refugees from both the former Kess Rith empire, exiled or disgusted TOG military legions, and large numbers of TOG women who defect to the Commonwealth.  Those women often join all female Commonwealth units called Minerva legions.  It is from these various rogue TOG units the setting derives the name of Renegade Legion as they form half of the professional army of the Commonwealth.  Their symbol continues to include the original TOG symbol of the planet Earth on an inverted pyramid background, however a hastily painted letter "R" made of four straight brush strokes in red paint is used to deface that original TOG symbol.

During a panel at RedCon95, FASA President Sam Lewis stated that the Renegade Legion series of games were originally designed for use with the Star Wars license. Since the license was awarded to West End Games, FASA chose to use the systems with their own setting.

The Renegade Legion series was made up of five board games, a role-playing game, a war game, two computer games, with another two games, one board game and one computer game, announced but never published. With the exception of one of the board games and the two computer games, the Renegade Legion series was compatible on all levels.

Board games 

Each of the boxed boardgames in the Renegade Legion series used a template-based mechanic to determine weapon damage.  When a unit was hit by a weapon, an additional die roll was used to determine the hit location; a geometric template was placed on the ship diagram at that location, and the armor boxes beneath that template were marked as destroyed.  Each weapon had a unique template; more- or less-powerful weapons would use larger or smaller versions of a standard template.  The intent was to add depth to the game system beyond simply counting up damage points (as in FASA's BattleTech), as weapon type and hit location would now be important to game resolution.

Another key aspect of the Renegade Legion series was interoperability.  All of the games in the system included rules for simultaneous play with the other games, for example using the starfighters from Interceptor as support for the action in a game of Centurion.

Renegade Legion games first shipped with die-cut cardboard boxes as the playing pieces; each side of the box depicted the unit from the appropriate angle (front, back, side, top, or bottom.)  The second edition of Centurion replaced these with plastic miniatures.

Interceptor The First Line of Defense
Interceptor was the first game of the Renegade Legion series, and was based on single- or two-crewmember starfighter combat.  A second Edition of the game was announced but not published.  Interceptor used a complex diagram of ship systems to track internal damage; this feature proved difficult for players to use and was not carried into the other games of the series.

Centurion Blood and Steel 
Centurion, the second in the Renegade Legion series, covered ground combat.  The primary units were high-speed antigravity tanks; the game also included ground vehicles, artillery, and infantry.

Leviathan Ships of the Line 
Leviathan covered capital ship combat. The starfighters from Interceptor were represented not as individual units, but as whole squadrons launched from massive starships.  While Leviathan used the same template-based damage resolution mechanic as the other games, the templates were much less complex.

Prefect 
Prefect was a more traditional wargame with large fold-out maps and hundreds of small cardboard counters, that shifted the action from the tactical level to the operational and involved the invasion of an entire star system. The player of Prefect was a high-level commander in either the TOG or Commonwealth forces and controlled thousands of ships, tanks and soldiers fighting over multiple worlds and millions of miles of space.

Circus Imperium 
Circus Imperium was the fifth of the Renegade Legion board games published by FASA, but unlike the others in the series, this tongue-in-cheek game of chariot racing was played strictly for laughs. The game involved anti-grav chariots being pulled by carnivorous beasts, with the object of the game to defeat the other racers, usually by knocking them out of the race or getting them eaten by the monsters. Outcomes of player actions were often random and unpredictable, and players could get points for eliciting laughs or the loudest cheers from other gamers. Ral Partha produced a series of lead figures for the game, including chariots, senators and imperial guards. Older catalogs have had these figures present as items available to order but in the exchange of BattleTech figures the Identifiers have changed. There were 3 variants under the old Ral Partha banner dependent on country of purchase.

Legionnaire 
Legionnaire was the role-playing game (RPG) set in the Renegade Legion universe. It expanded the original Renegade Legion setting with three new alien races: the Menelvagoreans, the Vauvusar, and the Zog.

Races in the Renegade Legion Universe 
In the Renegade Legion Universe, aliens are designated as a greater or lesser race determined by whether the race had acquired spaceflight before first contact with other alien species.

 Baufrin (Greater Race): One of the founding races of the Commonwealth, this insectoid race is strongly allied with the Renegades.
 Huldice, Lungdo, and Ritha (Lesser Races): Three early alien species encountered by the early TOG Empire. TOG was extremely xenophobic during this period and quickly conquered all three alien species, forcing them to be settled across the Empire in small colonies designed to prevent them from acquiring enough genetic diversity to survive as a species. The only surviving members wander the spacelanes as a sort of "Space Gypsies" trying to make a living as nomadic traders. Widely believed to be an extinct species.
 Hivers (Lesser Race): Discovered in a densely-packed cluster near the center of the galaxy, they have been dispersed among human settlements. They may have stolen a spaceship and escaped back to their home territory.
 Humans (Greater Race): A near-dominant species in the Renegade Legion Universe, split into two major factions, who are engaged in a civil war. The two factions are the Terran Overlord Government (T.O.G.) and the Commonwealth or Renegades. Each human faction possesses a variety of alien allies and enemies.
 Kessrith (Greater Race): An aggressive reptilian alien race best described as half-iguana, half-centaur. The Kessrith have a warrior society that is loosely allied with the Renegades. The Kessrith acquired FTL travel from the S'sora and used slow sub-light generation ships before their encounters with the S'sora.
 Menelvagoreans (Lesser Race): Large, hermaphroditic brutes standing over two meters tall and commonly weighing over 200 kilos. They come from a strange volcanically active hot world with a triple star system. Little is known about them, but many hypothesize that they are a silicoid species since they withstand the high heat levels of their home world. The Menelvagoreans are loosely allied with TOG.
 Naram (Greater Race): A humanoid race, nearly identical to mainstream humanity, who are strongly allied with the Renegades. Despite the very similar appearance and capability of interbreeding with humans, the Naram have developed a very different culture with different values than TOG humanity.
 S'sora (Greater Race): Reptilian humanoids who are allied with TOG. The S'sora had a large space empire by the time they encountered humanity and had also encountered the Kessrith. It is difficult to determine which S'sora stories are true since the S'sora are known for spreading disinformation amongst others.
 Vauvusar (Greater Race): An amphibian race, with four arms, two legs, and a large skulled head with eyes located on the side of the skull, well adapted to life on land or in  the water. The Vauvusar are loosely allied with the Renegades. The Vauvusar are also believed to be an extra-galactic visitor race from the Magellanic Clouds outside of the origin galaxy. It is unknown how they have travelled such vast distances.
 Zog (Lesser Race): A highly imitative primate-like race allied with TOG.

Technology

Grav vehicles 
One of the most common technologies of the setting are anti-gravity devices that allow planetary vehicles, starfighters, and other machines to fly.  The largest vehicles are corvette class starships used as scouts, couriers, and landing craft.  The main unit of the armies of Renegade Legion are grav tanks, grav APC's for transporting infantry, and Bounce Infantry that use grav belts to enable them to jump long distances even while fully loaded.  Gravity control is even used for nuclear devices in the form of a device known as a HELL bomb.  The bomb instantaneously increases the local gravity to such an extent that nearby matter undergoes nuclear fusion and explodes.

Because of the use of Grav vehicles, roads are not nearly as important to armies of the Renegade Legion setting.  Rivers often become major routes of travel as they are clear of obstructions.  Tank battles can also occur far out at sea, as grav tanks fly above the surface of the ocean, popping up from the troughs of large waves and exchanging fire with the enemy forces.  However, the altitude limit of anti-gravity is usually several hundred feet, and the top speed is 500 miles per hour at that altitude.  Flying a few feet above the ground is safer as grav vehicles are vulnerable to hits from below, and this also slows their top speed as they avoid crashing into terrain.

The visual art style of Renegade legion most often depicts grav vehicles as having a box shaped hull with two downward sloping prong bow section with upturned tips.  Frequently a large cannon is fitted into the hull between the bow prongs, as well as a turret with secondary weapons on top of the box hull.

Laser Weapons 
Another common weapon, but best known in the Renegade Legion setting for being a source of misery.  The crystals used to make the lasers are mined on various planets, but the crystals are toxic and mining them in the TOG is done with slave labor, often in a penal unit as punishment. Very large lasers are the Main armament of Starships and group-fired in large batteries (or bays) of 10-100 guns each. These guns range from 7.6 cm (3") to 37.5 cm (15") in diameter. Smaller ships (fighters or ground vehicles) are limited to the 7.6 cm as their maximum with smaller weapons available.

Gauss Weapons 

Military forces in the Renegade Legion setting make extensive use of electromagnetic projectile weapons, variously referred to as "mass drivers" or "gauss cannons".  These weapons range in size from infantry small arms to massive short-range weapons mounted in the bows of some starships, known as "spinal Mounts" they are referred to by crews as 'Crowbars' and used to open massive holes in the armor of ships that wander too close across their bow. These weapons are not available for ships configured as Fighter Carriers. Smaller weapons of up to 20 cm (8") are carried by ground vehicles as their main armament. these weapons can cripple enemy vehicles with as little as 1 hit, though usually more are needed.

Missile Weapons 

Military forces in the Renegade Legion setting also commonly use guided missiles of various types. Most starships carry mass volleys of powerful anti-ship missiles, Ground vehicles use smaller missiles of 2 type a laser-enhanced missile used to penetrate armor, also used by infantry, and a submunitions missile used to weaken armor ahead of other weapons. Fighter doctrine varies, the RL have missiles but tends to prefer weapons with more battlefield endurance such as lasers and mass-drivers, while the TOG prefers large missile volleys as their main fighter weapons, with other weapons as backup, for use when the missiles run out.

High Energy Weapons (Plasma, Particle, etc.) 

Plasma and various variants of high energy weapons (Proton, electron, neutron particle guns, etc.) also exist with one of the best known types being the Thorium Plasma Projector.

Weapons of Mass Destruction 

Various weapons of mass destruction also exist including the THOR satellite system (orbital kinetic-bombardment) and the HELL bomb, which instantaneously increases the local gravity to such an extent that nearby matter undergoes nuclear fusion and explodes. HELL bombs are similar to 20th century nuclear weapons.

Artillery, Ortillery and Other Weapons 

Ground combat in the Renegade Legion setting has a number of types of long-range fire support, including both indirect-fire artillery munitions and orbital kinetic-bombardment weapons (referred to as Thor satellites.)

T-space 
Faster than light travel (FTL) is possible in Renegade legion by spaceships that enter Tachyon-space, also known as T-space.  T-Space travel requires a ship to accelerate under computer control along a precise flight path before activating the T-space drive.  Once inside T-space the ship cannot turn in any direction as T-space does not follow the normal laws of physics.  In addition the energies involved will build up within the solid matter of the ship and crews, requiring no more than a month of travel in T-space before becoming dangerous.  An equal amount of time must be spent in the real space to dissipate the energy, known as Shimmer Heat, so named for the visual shimmering effect crews can see when entering and leaving T-space.  The ships of the Leviathan board game feature large fins on their hulls, and these are used to dissipate Shimmer Heat.

Exceeding the recommended maximum of one month in T-space will result in the over-charged solid matter exploding.

P-Comm 
The faster than light (FTL) communication related to T-space travel.  The range is limited, but it is possible to communicate with nearby star systems.  The devices are small enough to fit onto small spaceships.  However, the P-comm cannot be used while actually traveling in T-space.

Very Large Communication Relays (VLCA) 
VLCA stands for (Very Large Communications Array) and is the fastest communications technology available. Only the TOG possesses this technology, which requires huge surface or orbital facilities. It can also be mounted on large, specialized starships. The arrays are large space stations and can transmit and receive over far greater distances than the P-comm devices, even across the entire Milky Way galaxy.  This allowed the Republic/TOG government to make use of smaller forces for maximum effect than their enemies using only P-comm system.  However, they are quite large and must operate by line of sight to other known relay stations, rendering them useless on moving starships, or starships not at their assigned coordinates.

Shields 
Most military vehicles, ships, and fighters are equipped with invisible energy shields.  They deflect incoming attacks, though their protection is based on their flicker rate.  Shields cannot run continuously, so instead they cycle on and off many times a second.  A fixed percentage of attacks are rendered harmless due to their flicker rates, and higher quality shields have a better ratio of on-cycles to off-cycles when compared to low quality shields.  However, shields have limitations beyond this.  In grav tank battles the solid metal rounds fired by main gun/Gauss cannon are not affected by shields, as well as Thor satellite attacks and nuclear detonations.  Lasers, missiles, and infantry weapons are potentially stopped by shields, or hit with full impact depending if the shield was on or off at the moment of impact.

Shields are also directional.  A ship or tank can have very powerful shields in one direction, but weak or even no shields in another direction.  Grav vehicles usually have weak shield below them to save weight, and simply fly very close to the ground to avoid being hit in this weak spot.

Other games

Role-playing Game 
Legionnaire was the name of the role-playing game set in the Renegade Legion universe. While designed primarily as a stand-alone game, it could be integrated into the board games in the series, with stat conversions and guidelines for players who wished to do so.

Video games 
In addition to the board games and the role-playing game, two computer games set in this universe were published by Strategic Simulations, Inc. Renegade Legion: Interceptor was a straight translation of the turned-based board game of the same name, and allowed two players to fight each other with a squadron of starfighters. The Interceptor computer game also contained a ship creation generator, providing players the ability to produce custom ships.

The second game was called Renegade: the Battle for Jacob's Star. This game deviated from the Interceptor game system by becoming a space dogfighting simulator, very similar to Wing Commander.

A sequel to this game, titled Renegade II: Return to Jacob's Star, was near enough to completion to be reviewed in professional gaming magazines, but was never released. Next Generation reviewed the PC version of the game, rating it two stars out of five, and stated that "In its defense, Renegade 2 has succeeded in cutting down load times, and the high-res graphics are gorgeous without the need for the kind of horsepower required for Origin's latest, Wing Commander IV. Still, none of this is enough to keep Renegade 2 from being anything but a mediocre game at best."

Games development 
Nightshift games had given Don Gallagher the task of evolving the background as well as revising Interceptor into the long-announced 2nd Edition and creating the announced Phalanx board game.

In his proposal for the background, TOG collapsed and a new human ./. Kess Rith-conflict ensued. In Fan circles, this was received with mixed emotions, and many fans continue to play in the old storyline.

Interceptor, 2nd Edition abolished the flow chart-like internal damage system, in effect making it to "Centurion in Space". The completed rules have been released freely onto the internet, and have a certain following, but never existed as a published work in book format.

Phalanx was to be the game of individual combat, like Battletroops in Battletech or DMZ in Shadowrun. Luc Nadon and Dallen Masters did a playtest version that differed heavily from the Battletroops rules, in effect making Phalanx a tabletop game. No more than a HTML-ed playtest version exists. There is talk on the fanbase to merge the existing Phalanx and Sam Lewis' Battletroops into a Centurion-compatible game; the realisation status of this is unknown.

Novels and modules 
FASA published a number of titles in support of their Renegade Legion games. Interceptor, Centurion and Leviathan each had a number of modules that provided interlinking scenarios for gamers, and each had one technical sourcebook that provided additional ship and vehicle designs. In addition, FASA published Shannedam County, a sourcebook which profiled dozen of planets and star systems where adventures and battles could be set.

There were several paperback novels that used the Renegade Legion setting: Renegade's Honor by William H. Keith, Jr.; and Damned If We Do …, Frost Death, and Monsoon, all by Peter L. Rice.

Renegade Legion'''s Leviathan module was used as the base for FASA's Battletech new aerospace rules known at the time as BattleSpace.  Much of Leviathan's movement & damage system rules were used to make it. The Leviathan rules have continued to be used, updated and revised for Battletech's newer aerospace ruleset, Aerotech 2.

In 2006 Catalyst Game Labs revised and enhanced the Aerotech 2 rules. They were split up between Total Warfare and Techmanual.  Rules for large naval ships and spacestations are included in the 2008 rulebook, Strategic Operations.

In 2021, an anthology entitled "Voices of Varuna''" set in the Renegade Legion universe was published.

Notes

External links 

Renegade Legion Yahoo Group/Mailing List Obsoleted by Yahoogroups semi-shutdown, content transferred to groups.io.
Renegade Legion mailing list, file depository, and Group.IO

Science fiction board games
Miniature wargames
1990 video games
1995 video games
FASA games
Space opera games
Video games developed in the United States